The Italian order of precedence is fixed by Decree of the President of the Council of Ministers (D.P.C.M.) of April 14, 2006 and of April 16, 2008. It is a hierarchy of officials in the Italian Republic used to direct protocol. The President, being head of state, is first, and the Prime Minister (President of the Council of Ministers), the head of government, is fourth.

The President of the Republic (Sergio Mattarella)
(Cardinals and princes of reigning dynasties - these officers cannot preside over the ceremony)
The President of the Senate of the Republic (Ignazio La Russa)
The President of the Chamber of Deputies (Lorenzo Fontana)
The President of the Council of Ministers (Prime-Minister) (Giorgia Meloni)
The President of the Constitutional Court (Silvana Sciarra)
Former President of the Republic (Giorgio Napolitano)
Vice Presidents of the Senate of the Republic
Maurizio Gasparri
Anna Rossomando
Gian Marco Centinaio
Maria Domenica Castellone
Vice Presidents of the Chamber of Deputies
Sergio Costa
Fabio Rampelli 
Giorgio Mulé
Anna Ascani
Vice Presidents of the Council of Ministers
Antonio Tajani
Matteo Salvini
Vice Presidents of the Constitutional Court
Daria de Pretis
Nicolò Zanon
Ministers of the Republic
Judges of the Constitutional Court
Presidents of Regions
The First President of the Supreme Court of Cassation (Pietro Curzio)
The President of the National Council for Economics and Labour (Tiziano Treu)
Deputy Ministers of the Republic
Quaestors of the Senate and Chamber of Deputies, in order of seniority
Presidents of Parliamentary Commissions
The President of the Council of State (Luigi Maruotti)
The President of the Court of Accounts (Guido Carlino)
The Governor of the Central Bank of Italy (Ignazio Visco)
The General Prosecutor of the Supreme Court of Cassation (Gianfranco Ciani)
The Attorney General of the Republic (Gabriella Palmieri Sandulli)
The Chief of the Defence Staff 
Senators and Deputies, in order of appointment
The President of the Accademia dei Lincei (Roberto Antonelli)
The President of the National Research Council (Maria Chiara Carrozza)
The President of the Superior Court of Public Waters
The Vice President of the Council of Military Courts
The Vice President of the High Council of the Judiciary
The Presidents of the Autonomous Provinces of Trentino and South Tyrol
The Deputy President of the Supreme Court of Cassation
Prefects, in their provinces
Mayors, in their cities
Presidents and General Prosecutors of the Court of Appeals
Presidents of Provinces, in their cities
Catholic Bishops, in their dioceses
The Chief of the Army Staff (Amm. Giuseppe Cavo Dragone)
The Chief of the Navy Staff (Amm. Sq. Enrico Credendino)
The Chief of the Air Staff (Gen. S.A. Luca Goretti)
The President of the Permanent conference of Rectors (Dr. Ferruccio Resta)
Ambassadors, in order of establishment of diplomatic relations with their countries

References

Order of precedence
Italy